Karl Christopher Hankton (born July 24, 1970) is a former American football player in the National Football League.  He attended Trinity International University.  He was released by the Carolina Panthers on March 1, 2007.  He is the cousin of Cortez Hankton.

High school career
Hankton lettered in football, basketball, and track and field at De La Salle High School in New Orleans, Louisiana.

College career
Hankton earned NAIA All-America and All-Mid-States Football Association recognition as a senior at Trinity College.

Professional career
Hankton was a member of the Carolina special teams unit that led the NFL in opponents kickoff return average in 2002.  He recorded his first career blocked punt against the Tampa Bay Buccaneers in 2004, blocking a Josh Bidwell punt.  Hankton served as the Panthers special teams captain in 2002, 2003, and 2004.  He also ranks as Carolina's all-time leader with 62 special teams tackles.

1970 births
Living people
Players of American football from New Orleans
American football wide receivers
Washington Redskins players
Carolina Panthers players
LSU Tigers football players
Trinity Christian Trolls football players
Valley Forge Military Academy Trojans football players
Philadelphia Eagles players